Valentin Costin Dima (born 25 June 1989 in Bucharest) is a Romanian footballer.

References

External links
 
 

1989 births
Living people
Romanian footballers
Association football defenders
CS Concordia Chiajna players
FC Politehnica Iași (2010) players
ASC Daco-Getica București players
Liga I players
Liga II players